Villa d'Adda is a comune (municipality) in the Province of Bergamo in the Italian region of Lombardy, located about  northeast of Milan and about  west of Bergamo.

Villa d'Adda borders the following municipalities: Brivio, Calco, Calusco d'Adda, Carvico, Imbersago, Pontida, Robbiate.

Demographic evolution

References

External links
 www.comune.villadadda.bg.it